Lorenzo Jesús Morón García (born 30 December 1993), known as Loren, is a Spanish professional footballer who plays as a striker for UD Las Palmas, on loan from Real Betis.

Club career
Loren was born in Marbella, Province of Málaga, Andalusia, and represented CD Peña Los Compadres, UD Marbella and CD Vázquez Cultural as a youth. In 2012 he signed for Tercera División club Unión Estepona CF, making his senior debut on 1 September of that year in a 1–0 home loss against CD El Palo.

Loren scored his first senior goal on 30 September 2012, netting his team's third in a 4–1 home victory over Vélez CF. The following January he returned to Marbella, now being assigned to the first team also in the fourth division.

On 8 July 2014, after achieving promotion, Loren was loaned to fourth-tier side Vélez for a year. On 29 January of the following year, he signed for Real Betis and was immediately assigned to the reserves in the Segunda División B.

On 20 June 2016, after scoring 13 goals but failing to avoid relegation, Loren renewed his contract until 2018. On 14 May 2017, he scored a hat-trick in a 7–1 away rout of CA Espeleño.

On 30 January 2018, Loren extended his link until 2021 and was definitely promoted to the first team in La Liga. He made his professional debut on 3 February, starting and scoring a brace in a 2–1 home defeat of Villarreal CF. In the following five matches, he netted a further four times.

On 30 June 2018, Loren renewed his contract until June 2022. He made an impressive start to the 2019–20 season, leading him to being linked to FC Barcelona, Tottenham Hotspur, S.S.C. Napoli and A.C. Milan; however, he agreed to a further extension at the Estadio Benito Villamarín until 2024, with his buyout clause being set at €50 million.

Loren joined RCD Espanyol on 25 August 2021, on loan for the top-flight season. He scored his first goals on 1 December in the opening round of the Copa del Rey, a hat-trick in a 3–2 win at sixth-tier side SD Solares-Medio Cudeyo.

On 31 January 2023, after being rarely used for the Verdiblancos during the first half of the 2022–23 campaign, Loren was loaned to Segunda División side UD Las Palmas until June.

Personal life
Loren's father, also named Lorenzo, was also a footballer. A central defender, he represented mainly UD Salamanca and Recreativo de Huelva.

Career statistics

References

External links

Beticopedia profile 

1993 births
Living people
People from Marbella
Sportspeople from the Province of Málaga
Spanish footballers
Footballers from Andalusia
Association football forwards
La Liga players
Segunda División B players
Tercera División players
Marbella FC players
Betis Deportivo Balompié footballers
Real Betis players
RCD Espanyol footballers
UD Las Palmas players